Osvaldo Moreno (born June 4, 1981) is a Paraguayan footballer currently playing for 3 de Febrero of the División Intermedia in Paraguay.

Teams
The below are teams that Osvaldo joined:
  Persib Bandung 2002–2003
  PSM Makassar 2004–2005
  Santiago Wanderers 2006
  Persmin Minahasa 2007–2008
  Pegaso Real de Colima 2008–2010
  Aurora 2010
  3 de Febrero 2011–present

External links
 Profile at BDFA 
 
 Profile at Ligaindonesia

1981 births
Living people
Paraguayan footballers
Paraguayan expatriate footballers
Santiago Wanderers footballers
Club Aurora players
Primera B de Chile players
Persib Bandung players
PSM Makassar players
Expatriate footballers in Chile
Expatriate footballers in Mexico
Expatriate footballers in Bolivia
Expatriate footballers in Indonesia

Association footballers not categorized by position